Aichi (written: 愛知) is a Japanese surname. Notable people with the surname include:

, Japanese politician
, Japanese politician
, Japanese politician

Japanese-language surnames